Les Enfants jouent à la Russie (English: The Kids Play Russian) is a 1993 French film directed by Jean-Luc Godard and starring László Szabó and Godard. Szabó plays a Hollywood producer who hires a famous French filmmaker (Godard) to make a documentary about post-Cold War Russia. Instead the filmmaker stays in France and casts himself in the lead role of Fyodor Dostoyevsky's The Idiot.

Cast
László Szabó as Jack Valenti, the producer 
Jean-Luc Godard as Prince Mishkin, the idiot
Bernard Eisenschitz as Harry Blount
André S. Labarthe as Alcide Jolivet
Aude Amiot as Mademoiselle Amiel 
Bénédicte Loyen

References

External links

1993 films
French drama films
Films directed by Jean-Luc Godard
The Idiot
1990s French films